Fraus bilineata is a moth of the family Hepialidae. It is endemic to South Australia, Tasmania and Victoria.

The wingspan is 25–30 mm for males. Adults are on wing from late March to late April.

References

Moths described in 1865
Hepialidae